The Hopman Cup XXIII (also known as the Hyundai Hopman Cup for sponsorship reasons) corresponds to the 23rd edition of the Hopman Cup tournament between nations in men's and women's tennis. The tournament commenced on 1 January 2011 at the Burswood Dome in Perth, Western Australia. The tournament was contested on hard courts.

The tournament was attended by over seventy eight thousand people over the course of the week. This is the biggest attendance at the Hopman Cup where the tournament was held over eleven sessions.  Up until the eighteenth edition there was a play-off giving twelve sessions of play.

Eight teams competed for the title, with two round robin groups of four, from which the top team of each group progressed to the final. Spain were the 2010 champions but were not invited to defend their title. In the final the United States of America team of Bethanie Mattek-Sands and John Isner defeated Belgium's Justine Henin and Ruben Bemelmans 2–1. This was the USA's sixth Hopman Cup title.

Tournament
The 2011 Hyundai Hopman Cup is an invitational tennis tournament and is also known as the Official Mixed Teams Championships of the ITF.  The 2011 cup has prize money of A$1 million and follows the traditional round robin format, the leading teams after three round robin matches will qualify for the final. All matches are the best of three sets with the exception of the doubles where a match tie break, first to ten points, will be played if the match is tied at one set all.  All ties will be played in this format; women's singles, men's singles and finally mixed doubles. In the event of a tie in the final group standings the following will be used to separate the nations; 
 The highest total of matches won
 Best percentage of sets won and lost
 Head-to-head performances
 Toss of a coin

Seeds
The seeds for the 2011 Hopman Cup were decided by tournament director Paul McNamee, Rob Casey and Geoff Masters.

 – Ana Ivanovic / Novak Djokovic (withdrew before final match)
 – Laura Robson / Andy Murray (round robin)
 – Justine Henin / Ruben Bemelmans (runners-up) 
 – Francesca Schiavone / Potito Starace (round robin)

United States were originally seeded second. But when Serena Williams was replaced with Bethanie Mattek-Sands, the USA were demoted and not seeded with Italy now the number 4 seeds as Belgium and Great Britain move up a seed.

Group A

Teams and players
Group A was headed by the number one seeds Serbia. Serbia was represented by Novak Djokovic and Ana Ivanovic. Djokovic is currently ranked by the Association of Tennis Professionals at number 3, and is the 2008 Australian Open champion. Djokovic comes into the tournament fresh from reaching his third grand slam final at the US Open and winning the Davis Cup as well as reaching a career high of world number two in 2010. Ivanovic is the 2008 French Open champion and former world number one as ranked by the Women's Tennis Association and 2008 Australian Open finalist. Ivanovic had a mixed 2010, she teamed up and then split with Heinz Günthardt before winning her first title in two years at Linz before picking up the Tournament of Champions in Bali she is currently the world number seventeen. The pair have played together in the Hopman Cup before in 2006, where they missed out on the final by losing two more sets when compared to America's record.

Standings

Note: Ruben Bemelmans replaces Steve Darcis after he tore a ligament in his ankle.
Note: Sesil Karatantcheva replaces Yaroslava Shvedova after she injured her ankle following the tie between Kazakhstan and Serbia.

Australia vs. Belgium

Serbia vs. Kazakhstan

Belgium vs. Kazakhstan

Serbia vs. Australia

Australia vs. Kazakhstan

Serbia vs. Belgium

Group B

Standings

Note: Gaël Monfils was originally selected for France, but he pulled out with a knee injury. Nicolas Mahut replaces him, setting up for the first time a rematch of his Wimbledon clash with John Isner.

Great Britain vs. Italy

USA vs. France

USA vs. Italy

Great Britain vs. France

Italy vs. France

USA vs. Great Britain

Final

Serbia qualified for the final after winning their opening two matches, 3–0. They needed just one rubber against Belgium to qualify. After Henin beat Ana Ivanovic, Novak Djokovic booked Serbia's second trip to the Hopman Cup final defeating Bemelmans in straight sets. However, due to Ivanovic having an abdominal strain injury, Belgium replaced Serbia in the final, sneaking in above Australia because of their 2–1 win in the last rubber of the group. The United States of America qualified, after Bethanie Mattek-Sands won her singles match giving the USA the one rubber they needed to win the group; coupled with Francesca Schiavone's retirement from the opening rubber of the other tie; which ended Italy's chances of qualifying for the final. This meant that the USA needed to win one rubber to eliminate France.

Belgium vs USA

References

External links

Hopman Cup
Hopman Cups by year
Hopman Cup
Hopman Cup